Succinyl chloride is the organic compound with the formula (CH2)2(COCl)2. It is the acyl chloride derivative of succinic acid and a simple diacid chloride. It is a colorless liquid. It used as a reagent in organic synthesis.

References

External links 
 Fisher Scientific Data
 MSDS Safety Data

Acyl chlorides